Events in the year 2023 in Japan.

Incumbents
Emperor: Naruhito
Prime Minister: Fumio Kishida
Chief Cabinet Secretary: Hirokazu Matsuno
Chief Justice of Japan: Naoto Ōtani
Speaker of the House of Representatives: Tadamori Ōshima
President of the House of Councillors:  Akiko Santō

Governors
Aichi Prefecture: Hideaki Omura
Akita Prefecture: Norihisa Satake
Aomori Prefecture: Shingo Mimura
Chiba Prefecture: Toshihito Kumagai
Ehime Prefecture: Tokihiro Nakamura
Fukui Prefecture: Tatsuji Sugimoto
Fukuoka Prefecture: Seitaro Hattori
Fukushima Prefecture: Masao Uchibori
Gifu Prefecture: Hajime Furuta
Gunma Prefecture: Ichita Yamamoto
Hiroshima Prefecture: Hidehiko Yuzaki
Hokkaido: Naomichi Suzuki
Hyogo Prefecture: Motohiko Saitō
Ibaraki Prefecture: Kazuhiko Ōigawa
Ishikawa: Masanori Tanimoto
Iwate Prefecture: Takuya Tasso
Kagawa Prefecture: Keizō Hamada
Kagoshima Prefecture: Kōichi Shiota
Kanagawa Prefecture: Yuji Kuroiwa
Kumamoto Prefecture: Ikuo Kabashima
Kochi Prefecture: Seiji Hamada
Kyoto Prefecture: Takatoshi Nishiwaki
Mie Prefecture: Eikei Suzuki
Miyagi Prefecture: Yoshihiro Murai
Miyazaki Prefecture: Shunji Kōno
Nagano Prefecture: Shuichi Abe
Nagasaki Prefecture: Hōdō Nakamura 
Nara Prefecture: Shōgo Arai
Niigata Prefecture: Hideyo Hanazumi
Oita Prefecture: Katsusada Hirose
Okayama Prefecture: Ryuta Ibaragi
Okinawa Prefecture: Denny Tamaki
Osaka Prefecture: Ichirō Matsui
Saga Prefecture: Yoshinori Yamaguchi
Saitama Prefecture: Motohiro Ōno
Shiga Prefecture: Taizō Mikazuki
Shimame Prefecture: Tatsuya Maruyama
Shizuoka Prefecture: Heita Kawakatsu
Tochigi Prefecture: Tomikazu Fukuda
Tokushima Prefecture: Kamon Iizumi
Tokyo Prefecture: Yuriko Koike
Tottori Prefecture: Shinji Hirai
Toyama Prefecture: Hachiro Nitta
Wakayama Prefecture: Yoshinobu Nisaka
Yamagata Prefecture: Mieko Yoshimura
Yamaguchi Prefecture: Tsugumasa Muraoka
Yamanashi Prefecture: Kotaro Nagasaki

Events

January
 January 1 to ongoing – According to Ministry of Agriculture, Forestry and Fisheries official confirmed report, at least 11 livestock farm place were bird flu, resulting H5N1 type from death bodies positive test on nationwide, and 3.9 million chickens were culling by Japan Self Ground Defense Force.
 January 13 – According to the Ministry of Justice and Ministry of Health, Labour and Welfare, Japanese prosecutors indicts Tetsuya Yamagami for the suspect of killing former Japanese Prime Minister Shinzo Abe, who was assassinated on July 8, 2022 in Nara.
 January 19 – According to official confirmed report, Tokyo Institute of Technology and Tokyo Medical and Dental University were merged, new name is Tokyo Institute Science University, that start on April 2024.
 January 20 – The Bank of Japan reports that inflation in Japan increased by 4.0% in December, the highest recorded increase since 1981.
 January 22 – Four people are killed and three others are feared dead in an apartment fire in Kobe.
 January 25 – A Hong Kong-registered ship carrying 22 people capsize off the waters of Japan. 13 crew members are rescued, but two later died, and nine are still missing.

February 
 February 3 - A Executive Secretary to the Prime Minister of Fumio Kishida,   said "I would not want to live next to, or look at the homosexual".

Arts and entertainment
2023 in anime
2023 in Japanese music
2023 in Japanese television
List of 2023 box office number-one films in Japan
List of Japanese films of 2023

Sports
 September 10 – 2023 FIA World Endurance Championship is held at 2023 6 Hours of Fuji
 September 24 – 2023 Formula One World Championship is held at 2023 Japanese Grand Prix
 October 1 – 2023 MotoGP World Championship is held at 2023 Japanese motorcycle Grand Prix
 2023 F4 Japanese Championship
 2023 Super Formula Championship
 2023 Super Formula Lights
 2023 Super GT Series
 2022 AFC Champions League (Japan)
 2023 in Japanese football
 2023 J1 League
 2023 J2 League
 2023 J3 League
 2023 Japan Football League
 2023 Japanese Regional Leagues
 2023 Japanese Super Cup
 2023 Emperor's Cup
 2023 J.League Cup

Deaths

January
January 1 – Tetsuo Hasegawa, actor (b. 1938)
January 11 – Yukihiro Takahashi, musician (b. 1952)
January 23 – Hiromitsu Kadota, baseball player (b. 1948)

February
February 5 – Takako Sasuga, voice actress (b. 1936) 
February 7 – Hiroki Nakata, shogi player (b. 1964)
February 10 – Satoshi Iriki, baseball player (b. 1967)
February 13 – Leiji Matsumoto, animator and manga artist (b. 1938)
February 14 – Shoichiro Toyoda, business executive (b. 1925)
February 15 – Shōzō Iizuka, voice actor (b. 1933)
February 16 – Maon Kurosaki, singer and songwriter (b. 1988)
February 25 – Mitsuo Senda, voice actor (b. 1940)

March
March 2 – Ryuho Okawa, religious leader (b. 1956)
March 5
Takahiro Kimura, animator,  illustrator and character designer  (b. 1964)
Kenzaburō Ōe, writer (b. 1935)
March 9 – Chikage Oogi, actress and politician (b. 1933)
March 11 – Chen Kenichi, chef (b. 1956)

See also

Country overviews

 Japan
 History of Japan
 Outline of Japan
 Government of Japan
 Politics of Japan
 Years in Japan
 Timeline of Japanese history

Related timelines for current period

 2023
 2020s
 2020s in political history

References

 
Japan
Japan
2020s in Japan
Years of the 21st century in Japan